The Cal State LA Solar Car Team was a group of engineering students at California State University, Los Angeles that developed the Solar Eagle series of solar cars that competed in solar car races in the United States and Australia.

Solar Eagle

1990: Solar Eagle - GM Sunrayce USA: 4th place
1990: Solar Eagle - World Solar Challenge: in the top ten
On display at Cal State LA

The Solar Eagle was designed and built by the Cal State L.A. School of Engineering & Technology students, faculty and staff. In July 1990, the Solar Eagle placed fourth in the 1,643 mile GM Sunrayce, the best performance among California entrants, and ahead of 28 other colleges and universities including MIT and Stanford. In the daily races, it placed first twice, second once, and third place three times, and the Solar Eagle was the only car in the race that had no mechanical or electrical failures during the race.

World Solar Challenge
The Solar Eagle placed in the top ten out of 40 cars from 9 countries (13 Australia, 11 Japan, 9 United States) during the 1990 World Solar Challenge in Australia. The race took place on November 11, 1990 starting from Darwin and ending in Adelaide, Australia, covering .

Technical specifications
Length: 6 meters
Width: 2 meters
Height: 1 meter
Weight: 459 pounds (without driver)
Drag Coefficient: 0.123
Frame: Welded 6061 T6 aluminum alloy tubing (Weight=23 pounds)
Body: Carbon fiber/NOMEX composite sandwich
Solar panel: Fiberglass/NOMEX composite sandwich
Solar cells: 8,945 Spectrolab K7 single-crystal silicon space quality cells
Motor: Unique Mobility, Inc. DC brushless motor
Batteries: Eagle-Picher silver-zinc batteries; 120 volt nominal buss voltage; 4 kW-hr total capacity at C20 rate

Awards
The car also won three Department of Energy Awards: first place for "Best Artistic Design" ($500), second place for "Innovation in Power Train Design" ($800), and third place for "Teamwork" ($600). 

Other honors include: 
Society of Automotive Engineers: fifth place for "Engineering Design and Safety"
Engineering Excellence Award: Unique Mobility, Inc.
The Governor's Energy Award: State of Florida
Team Honored by Los Angeles City Council, August 10, 1990
Nationally televised appearance on Into the Night, Starring Rick Dees, August 15, 1990
Team Honored by Department of Water and Power Board of Commissioners, August 23, 1990
City of Los Angeles, Mayor Tom Bradley: Commendation
Board of Directors, City of Pasadena: Commendation
City of Alhambra, Mayor Barbara Messina: Commendation
City of Monterey Park, Mayor Judy Chu: Commendation
U.S. Senator Pete Wilson: Commendation
U.S. Congressman Matthew G. Martinez: Congressional Award

Solar Eagle II

1993: Solar Eagle II - GM Sunrayce USA: 3rd place
1993: Solar Eagle II - World Solar Challenge: 13th place
On display at the California Science Center in Los Angeles

In June 1993, the Solar Eagle II placed third in the 1000 mile Sunrayce 93 — a cross-country race from Dallas, Texas to Minneapolis, Minnesota. The Solar Eagle II started the race in the pole position having qualified with the fastest time. Solar Eagle II finished ahead of 33 other universities including such Stanford, George Washington University and UC Berkeley. The car and team were honored with a second place award in Technical Innovation for Chassis Design, Propulsion and Aerodynamic Systems by the Sunrayce 93 judges and they received a third place award from the Society of Automotive Engineers (SAE) for Design Excellence in Engineering Safety.  In November 1993, the Solar Eagle II gained international recognition by placing thirteenth out of a fifty-four car field, and became the fourth U.S. team to cross the finish line at the 1993 World Solar Challenge, a grueling 1,882 mile race across the Australian outback.

Cal State L.A. was selected as one of 30 universities granted entry in the Sunrayce 95 competition as well, for which the Solar Eagle II was revamped.

Technical specifications
Length: 16 feet
Width: 6.1 feet
Height: 3.3 feet
Weight: 360 pounds (without driver and batteries)
Structure: Welded aluminum space frame with carbon fiber composite battery box and underneath pan to provide shear and torsional strength.
Body: Carbon fiber skin with Rohacell structural foam core
Solar power system: 754 single crystal BP Saturn cells (3.7" x 3/8") on top; 824 quarter-size cut cells on vehicle sides, cerium-doped and antireflective

Solar Eagle III

1997: Solar Eagle III - GM Sunrayce USA: 1st place
On display at Cal State LA

Solar Eagle III was the third solar-powered electric vehicle built by Cal State L.A. Again engineered by students under the guidance of faculty and staff, the Solar Eagle III drew from the first two designs, the Solar Eagle and the Solar Eagle II.

On Saturday, June 28, 1997, the Solar Eagle III won Sunrayce 97, the national intercollegiate solar car race. The combined team of Stanford University/UC Berkeley finished third. Texas A&M, whose team used the molds from Cal State L.A.'s Solar Eagle II to build their entry, the MACH V, finished fourth.

During the 1,230 mile course from Indianapolis to Colorado Springs, the Solar Eagle III suffered no breakdowns or other unscheduled stops, a distinction shared with only the Texas A&M MACH V.

Technical specifications
 Weight: 427 pounds (without driver and batteries)
 Length: 19.2 feet
 Width: 6.3 feet
 Height: 3.1 feet
 Rolling Chassis: carbon fiber monocoque structure
 Body and Solar Panel: carbon fiber skin with Nomex honeycomb core Solar Cells: 762 terrestrial grade silicon cells (4.05" x 3.94") by Siemens wired in four parallel strings
 Panel Voltage: 85-volts peak string voltage
 Tire Rolling Resistance: 0.0045
 Drag Coefficient: 0.15
 Wheel Base: 104 inches
 Wheels and Tires: wheels have composite centers with aluminum rims; tires are Bridgestone Ecopia
 Brakes and Suspension: front brakes are mechanical hydraulic; regenerative rear brakes. Suspension is double A-arm in the front and swing arm in the rear
 Batteries: 108-volt system with nine 12-volt batteries by U.S. Battery Manufacturing Company; weight-307 lbs
 Motor System: two interchangeable motor systems:
 Wheel motor (NGM-SC-M100) and controller (NGM-SC-C100) by New Generation Motor Corporation
 DC brushless motor (BRLS8) and controller (110H) by Solectria Corporation with belt drive

References

Further reading

External links

California State University, Los Angeles
Solar car racing